Christ Church Deer Park is a parish of the Anglican Church of Canada in the Diocese of Toronto. The parish church is located at 1570 Yonge Street, in the Deer Park area of Toronto, Ontario. Christ Church Deer Park is part of the Churches on the Hill, an ecumenical grouping of local congregations.

History 
Originally a mission of the parish of St. John's, York Mills, it was one of the earliest Anglican churches in North Toronto. While the mission congregation began meeting in Leaside in the 1860s, it later moved to the area of Deer Park. Today, the parish is known largely for its tradition of choral music.

In 1911, the parish of Grace Church on-the-Hill was carved out of the Christ Church parish boundaries. In 1970, the church was the site of the ordination to the priesthood of Andrew Hutchison, who would later serve as Primate of the Anglican Church of Canada.

On January 1, 2018, the Rev. Canon Cheryl Palmer became the Rector of Christ Church Deer Park. The previous Rector was the Rev. Canon Kevin Robertson, who was consecrated Area Bishop of York-Scarborough in January 2017.

Gallery

See also
 
 List of Anglican churches in Toronto

References

External links 
 Official website
 Christ Church Deer Park – Architectural Conservancy of Ontario

Anglican church buildings in Toronto
20th-century Anglican church buildings in Canada